The term CLU can refer to:

Organizations 
 California Lutheran University
 Claremont Lincoln University
 Communion and Liberation – University
 Czech Lacrosse Union

Other uses 
 CLU (gene), the gene for clusterin
 CLU (programming language)
 Clu (Tron), fictional character from the Tron franchise
 Chartered Life Underwriter, a financial professional designation
 Command Launch Unit for the FGM-148 Javelin 
 Common Land Unit
 Containerized living unit

See also 
 Clue (disambiguation)